Skepticon may refer to:
Skepticon, an American annual skeptical conference in Springfield, Missouri.
Skepticon (Скептикон), a Russian-language annual skeptical conference in Moscow, see Skeptic Society.
SkepKon, a German-language annual skeptical conference in a German, Austrian or Swiss city, see Gesellschaft zur wissenschaftlichen Untersuchung von Parawissenschaften.
SkeptiCalCon, an American annual skeptical conference in Oakland, California.
SkepchickCon, an American annual scientific skepticism track at CONvergence.

See also 
List of skeptical conferences